Singapore Innovation League is a technology company that was founded in 2014.

References

   Innovation league in Singapore launches mobile app

  NRI founded innovation league in Singapore launches mobile app

  Indian, Chinese firms leading top 10 Asian tech billionaire list

Technology companies of Singapore